This is a list of notable companies providing voice over Internet Protocol (VoIP) services.

VoIP